Algorithms-Aided Design (AAD) is the use of specific algorithms-editors to assist in the creation, modification, analysis, or optimization of a design. The algorithms-editors are usually integrated with 3D modeling packages and read several programming languages, both scripted or visual (RhinoScript®, Grasshopper®, MEL®, C#, Python®). The Algorithms-Aided Design allows designers to overcome the limitations of traditional CAD software and 3D computer graphics software, reaching a level of complexity which is beyond the human possibility to interact with digital objects. The acronym appears for the first time in the book AAD Algorithms-Aided Design, Parametric Strategies using Grasshopper, published by Arturo Tedeschi in 2014.

Further reading
Mario Carpo, "The second digital turn: design beyond intelligence", Writing Architecture, 2017, 
"AD Scripting Cultures: Architectural Design and Programming", John Wiley & Sons, 1 edition 2011, 
 Kostas Terzidis, "Algorithmic Architecture", Routledge, 1 edition 2006, 
 Nicholas Pisca, "YSYT - Maya MEL Basics for Designers", 2009, 
 Arturo Tedeschi, AAD Algorithms-Aided Design, Parametric Strategies using Grasshopper, Le Penseur, Brienza 2014, 
 http://architosh.com/2016/05/inflection-point-disruptions-platforms-and-growth-with-rhino-grasshopper-part-1/

References

External links

Computer-aided design